Mid and East Antrim Borough Council is a local authority that was established on 1 April 2015. It replaced Ballymena Borough Council, Carrickfergus Borough Council and Larne Borough Council.

History 
On 2 December 2021, the councils chief executive Anne Donaghy was suspended and stated her intention to take legal action for discrimination. In January 2023, she announced her retirement.

In 2022, another DUP councillor, Marc Collins, was suspended for abusive tweets directed at Sinn Féin MP John Finucane and his family.

Mayoralty

Mayor

Deputy Mayor

Councillors
For the purpose of elections the council is divided into seven district electoral areas (DEA):

Party strengths

Councillors by electoral area

† Co-opted to fill a vacancy since the election.♭ Elected in a by-election.‡ New party affiliation since the election.– Suspended from council.Last updated 12 October 2022.

For further details see 2019 Mid and East Antrim District Council election.

Population
The area covered by the new Council has a population of 135,338 residents according to the 2011 Northern Ireland census.

References

External links 
 

District councils of Northern Ireland
Politics of County Antrim
2015 establishments in Northern Ireland